Rome is a census-designated place (CDP) in Medina Township, Peoria County, Illinois, United States. The population of the CDP was 1,738 at the 2010 census. Rome is part of the Peoria, Illinois Metropolitan Statistical Area.

Geography

Demographics
At the 2000 census, there were 1,776 people, 704 households and 508 families residing in the CDP. The racial makeup was 98.20% White, 0.28% African American, 0.34% Asian, 0.11% Pacific Islander, 0.34% from other races, and 0.73% from two or more races. Hispanic or Latino of any race were 1.24% of the population.

There were 704 households, of which 29.8% had children under the age of 18 living with them, 60.5% were married couples living together, 8.8% had a female householder with no husband present, and 27.7% were non-families. 23.0% of all households were made up of individuals, and 7.2% had someone living alone who was 65 years of age or older. The average household size was 2.51 and the average family size was 2.95.

23.6% of the population were under the age of 18, 7.4% from 18 to 24, 29.7% from 25 to 44, 26.7% from 45 to 64, and 12.6% who were 65 years of age or older. The median age was 40 years. For every 100 females, there were 105.3 males. For every 100 females age 18 and over, there were 104.7 males.

The median household income was $40,962 and the median family income was $46,250. Males had a median income of $35,036 and females $25,486. The per capita income was $18,345. About 3.7% of families and 4.4% of the population were below the poverty line, including 2.5% of those under age 18 and 10.7% of those age 65 or over.

References

Census-designated places in Peoria County, Illinois
Census-designated places in Illinois
Peoria metropolitan area, Illinois